In Canadian folklore, Seelkee (transcribed in English from Halqemeylem, the local indigenous language) is a lake monster reported to have lived in the swamps of what is now Chilliwack, in British Columbia, Canada. Seelkee has been allegedly seen by the Stó:lō, First Nations, people for hundreds of years. The most common description of Seelkee is a 10 to 15-foot-long sea serpent like beast with the head of a horse.

Most descriptions talk about how the creature was snake-like with two heads. Mostly black the serpent had red circular designs. The primary summer shelters for the Stó:lō people was in the form of a longhouse. Although some modern longhouses were built with gabled roofs, most Stó:lō longhouses were built with a single flat, but slanted roof, similar to the Xá:ytem Longhouse. Entire extended families would live in a longhouse, and the structure could be extended as the family expanded. Some of the longhouses in the local Stó:lō villages were defined by large house posts with Seelkee designs accented with red paint.

One of the first Caucasian settlers of the region, Issac Kipp, reportly saw a Seelkee and spoke how he was told by the local Sto:lo people never to turn your back on the beast. Saying "Don't turn around, if you do you'll be sick."

See also
 Igopogo, said to live in Lake Simcoe, Ontario
 Loch Ness Monster
 Ogopogo, said to live in Okanagan Lake, BC
 Memphre, said to live in Lake Memphremagog, Quebec
 List of reported lake monsters
 Selkie, a similar named creature

Bibliography 
Notes

References
 - Total pages: 208 
 - Total pages: 722 
 - Total pages: 226 
 - Total pages: 42 

Culture of British Columbia
Canadian folklore
First Nations in British Columbia
SEelkee
Canadian legendary creatures
Legendary creatures of the indigenous peoples of North America
Sea serpents